Saint-Laurent-d'Agny is a commune in the Rhône department of eastern France, southwest of Lyon.

See also
Communes of the Rhône department

References

Communes of Rhône (department)